A swing vote is a vote that is seen as potentially going to any of a number of candidates in an election, or, in a two-party system, may go to either of the two dominant political parties. Such votes are usually sought after in election campaigns, since they can play a big role in determining the outcome.

A swing voter or floating voter is a voter who may not be affiliated with a particular political party (Independent) or who will vote across party lines. In American politics, many centrists, liberal Republicans, and conservative Democrats are considered "swing voters" since their voting patterns cannot be predicted with certainty.

While the swing voter is ostensibly the target of most political activity during elections, another factor is the success of each party in rallying its core support. In a two-party system, those who become disillusioned with their once-favored party are more likely to vote third-party or abstain than cross over.

Smaller groups that use voting to decide matters, such as chambers of parliament and supreme courts, can also have swing voters. The smaller the group, the more power swing voters can have. For example, on a court of seven judges, of which three are committed to each side of a case, the seventh judge may be seen as single-handedly deciding the case.

Impact on campaigning 
Swing Vote can have a very broad meaning and has been used in many different contexts by different media and news outlets. The truest definition would be someone who has not yet made up their mind on how they will be voting. These voters can be easily persuaded and are cross pressured. This is particularly significant when considering where political parties choose to focus their campaigning efforts. The voters who can be convinced are the voters that receive the most attention because campaigns will not bother to engage the voters they know will show up to the polls and support them.

Focusing only on the undecided voters instead of all voters at large is a core part of almost all political campaigns. With this framework in mind, the idea of a swing vote can closely tie with the concept of swing states. Swing/Battleground states are states that neither party can guarantee will go in their favor. These are the states that politicians will most likely focus their time to maximize their reach, in the same way that there is a focus on swing voters. It is crucial to note that identifying battleground states is much easier than identifying individual swing votes.

Calculating a swing voter 
Deciding who is a swing voter can be calculated by measuring how a voter feels about each of the candidates. The American National Election Studies (ANES) created a scale by asking how favorably they see each candidate from negative 100 to 100, with zero as neutral. Then, the two scores for the candidates are subtracted and the smaller the difference is, the more likely that the person is a swing voter. The answers are indicative of the voters voting behavior and their ideological identification. The ANES also shows about the relationship between scale position and “convertibility”—the likelihood that a campaign can change a person’s vote intention. This method of measurement is also a good indication of how polarized the public already is. For example, in 2004, only 13% of the voters were considered swing voters which is lower compared to previous elections.

Profile
In an election, there are "certain" or "lock" votes, voters who are solidly behind or partisan to a particular candidate and will not consider changing their minds whatever the opposition says. Swing voters are undecided about how they will vote. They are sometimes referred to as undecideds, undecided voters, or floating voter.

They may be dissatisfied party members who are open to the idea of voting for other parties, or they could be officially registered as "independents" or simply people who have never had a strong affiliation with any political party and will vote depending on certain things that influence them: healthcare, benefits, election campaign, etc.

Some might be people who have never exercised their right to vote before, such as those just reaching voting age. Some, but not all, swing voters are considered to be "low-information voters." Because the votes of swing voters are considered to be "up for grabs," candidates direct a fair proportion of campaign effort towards them, but they must also be concerned with voter turnout among their political base. There is a perception that swing voters are primarily motivated by self-interest rather than values or ideology and so are particularly susceptible to pork barreling.

If a constituency contains a large proportion of swing voters it is often called a marginal seat and extensive campaign resources are poured into it.

Demographics within the United States

An April 2016 poll by the Progressive Policy Institute examined voters in the U.S. states considered "battlegrounds" in the upcoming presidential election (Florida, Ohio, Colorado and Nevada). Swing voters were slightly more likely to be women (52 percent women, 48 percent men) and slightly less likely to have a college degree (44 percent) than voters overall in these states (48 percent). By contrast, race was a significant determinant, especially for African-Americans. While 7 percent of poll respondents identified as African-American, only 2 percent of swing voters were African-American. Latinos (12 percent of poll respondents) were represented more proportionately (13 percent of swing voters).

"Overall, white voters are likely to swing the outcome of a national election by an average of 10 percentage points—voting more Democratic in elections Democrats win and more Republican in elections Republicans win," according to a 2008 report by the Democratic Leadership Council. Most of this (6.7 of the 10 percentage points) is due to those white people who have only a high school education.

In mid-term and presidential elections from 1992 to 2014, people who self-identified as "gay, lesbian, or bisexual" voted consistently "around 75 percent Democratic within a range of 67 to 81 percent." In the 2016 presidential election, people who identified as gay, lesbian, bisexual or transgender cast 78 percent of their votes for the Democratic candidate Hillary Clinton.

Among people who identify as gay and bisexual, men's support for Democratic candidates in the 1990s Congressional elections (held every two years from 1990 to 1998) was more consistent than women's. Across these five elections, men's support ranged from 67 percent to 75 percent, while women's support ranged from 53 percent to 82 percent. This suggests that lesbian and bisexual women may be more likely swing voters, at least over time, if not necessarily for any given election. There are also differences by state: "California GLB voters are more likely to identify as 'Independent' than are GLB voters nationally, and therefore have a greater potential to play the role of a swing vote in a close election."

In the 2020 election, 30% of voters were considered swing voters. The swing votes in this election demographically were younger, ideologically moderate, disengaged in politics. Political apathy also plays a part in identifying swing voters. 24 percent of swing voters did not vote in the 2016 election and 22 percent did not vote in the 2018 election. 18-29 year olds were the age group that had the highest percentage of swing voters - there was about the same number of swing voters as there were "decided voters". In the oldest age group of 65 and older, only 22 percent are considered swing voters. Another important datapoint from the 2020 election was that 39% of Swing Voters say they are paying "a lot" of attention to politics, compared to the 68% of decided voters that pay attention.

Impact
Swing voters occasionally play a huge part in elections. First-time voters and swing voters are usually credited for helping Jesse Ventura win the Minnesota gubernatorial election in 1998. Swing voters who support third-party candidates take potential votes away from the major candidates. Ventura was a third-party candidate; his opponents were seen as two weak major-party candidates, and this situation created many more swing voters than usual. This resulted in Jesse Ventura, the third-party candidate, winning the election.

In the Supreme Court of the United States the swing justice, if one exists, essentially decides the overall outcome of the ruling during a split, which can mean highly impacting landmark decisions. For example, the effective decision of the President of the United States in the 2000 election was ultimately made by Justice Anthony Kennedy in the Bush v. Gore case.

Examples
Common examples of swing voters include "Reagan Democrats" (Democrats who voted for Republican Ronald Reagan in the 1980s) and "Clinton Conservatives" (Republicans who voted for Bill Clinton). In her 2012 book The Swing Vote, Linda Killian divides the American swing vote into 4 factions: NPR Republicans, America First Democrats, the Facebook Generation, and Starbucks Moms and Dads. On the Supreme Court of the United States, Associate Justices Potter Stewart, Byron White, Sandra Day O'Connor, Anthony Kennedy, and Chief Justice John Roberts have been described as swing votes between the two factions of the court. In the United Kingdom, the "Essex man", "Worcester woman" and "Holby City woman" are examples of personifications of swing voters.

See also
Voter apathy
Marginal seat
Swing (politics)
Swing state

Further reading

References

Political terminology of the United States
Elections
Voting in the United States